The 2014 Georgia Fire season was the first season as a professional indoor football franchise and their first in the Professional Indoor Football League. One of 8 teams that competed in the PIFL for the 2014 season.

With complications surrounding the Albany Panthers franchise for the 2014 season, the Professional Indoor Football League (PIFL) introduced the Fire to replace the Panthers for the 2014 season. With the league running the team, PIFL Executive Director, Jeff Ganos was named the franchise's general manager and Cosmo DeMatteo was named the team's innaurgal head coach on February 27, 2014. With the season starting on April 5, 2014, the Fire were given the Panthers roster, where players who didn't wish to play for the new franchise, refused to report. In the first game in franchise history, the Fire knocked off defending PIFL Champions, the Alabama Hammers by a score of 57–55. The Fire finished the season 4–8, failing to make the playoffs.

Schedule
Key:

Regular season
All start times are local to home team

Roster

Division Standings

References

External links
2014 results

2014 Professional Indoor Football League season
Georgia Fire
2014 in sports in Georgia (U.S. state)